The Belgrade Theatre is a live performance venue in Coventry, England. It was the first civic theatre to be built in Britain after the Second World War and is now a Grade II listed building.

Background
Coventry was the fastest growing city in Britain between the First and Second World Wars. Its cramped medieval streets were becoming dangerously congested and overcrowded, and in 1938 the City Council appointed Donald Gibson to become the first city architect. The newly created City Architect's Department had ambitious plans, and the devastation of the Coventry Blitz allowed it more freedom to design an entirely new city centre. In 1955 Gibson resigned; extensive work had already taken place in the city centre but a growing Coventry required further development. The person that took over from him, Arthur Ling, would be the designer of the Belgrade Theatre.

Some versions of the overall plan for the city centre included three new theatres and cinemas, but during the 1950s it became clear that this would not be viable. There were still two pre-war cinemas operating in the city centre, and audiences were falling. It was decided that a single new theatre would be built on the corner of Corporation Street and Upper Well Street.

History

The first steps of construction took place in 1952, when Coventry's twin city of Belgrade, Yugoslavia (now Serbia), pledged a gift of beech timber to be used in the new theatre. It is after this city that the Belgrade is named. The Yugoslavian ambassador Ivo Vejvoda visited the construction site in 1957, during the same trip he also opened an exhibition of modern Yugoslavian art at the Herbert Gallery. In the same year, the Arts Council announced that they would give financial support to the City Council to equip the new theatre, which was going over budget.

The Belgrade was officially opened at 8 pm on 27 March 1958 by the Duchess of Kent in a ceremony attended by many "civic personalities and representatives of the theatre world" including Sir Kenneth Clark and Sam Wanamaker. Coventry's first female Lord Mayor, Pearl Hyde, gave an address of welcome and thanks to the Duchess from the Royal box before the first show began, Half in Earnest by Vivian Ellis.

Under Bryan Bailey, the theatre's first director, the Belgrade's resident company was established. This was the first Coventry-based theatre company since the Midland Theatre Company was disbanded by the Arts Council in 1957, producing the premieres of the "Wesker trilogy" (Chicken Soup with Barley, Roots and I'm Talking About Jerusalem) by Arnold Wesker. In the 1960s the Belgrade developed the innovative Theatre in Education concept, beginning with its project Pow Wow. This took a group of children and encouraged them to form a relationship with a cowboy. They were then introduced to an American Indian who was being kept in a cage as a prisoner, and given more information about the characters and their views. In the end the children had to decide whether to free the prisoner or not. This blend of theatre and education had never been seen before.

The theatre received a number of grants for maintenance and renovation through the 1980s and 1990s, before a major refurbishment was announced as part of Coventry's Millenium project. It was closed in 2006 for extensive building work including the addition of a new performance space, which took ten months longer than expected, at a total cost of around £11 million. The theatre eventually reopened on 22 September 2007 with a performance of Mr Puntila and His Man Matti. The new B2 studio performance area was opened by Prince Edward on 4 February 2008, the 50th anniversary year of the Belgrade's inaugural performance.

UK City of Culture 2021
The Belgrade was involved in the bid for Coventry to become UK City of Culture 2021, which it won in December 2017. There were scenes of jubilation at the theatre where Coventrians had gathered to hear the announcement of the winner. Three co-artistic directors were appointed for the City of Culture year: Justine Themen, Corey Campbell and Balisha Karra. They were to oversee the producing programme for 2021, "providing an opportunity for a new generation of creative talent to explore their own ideas about how to take the industry forward". On 3 March 2021 it was announced that two producers would join the creative team for 2021: Sâmir Bhamra and Krysztina Winkel. Bhamra praised the theatre for its "commitment [to] ensuring diverse voices are at the heart of the team leading its produced programme for 2021".

2021 Spring Season
The Belgrade's 2021 Spring Season will run from March to July, and will include "an eclectic mix" of drama, musicals and live music.

Events in collaboration with Coventry UK City of Culture
The Belgrade is going to collaborate with the Coventry UK City of Culture Trust to produce a number of events in 2021. These will include a series of performances in the Roundabout pop-up theatre as well as online and outdoor performances such as Can You Hear Me, Now? and Like There's No Tomorrow.

Design and construction
The Coventry City Architect's Department under Donald Gibson produced a model in 1944 that showed three interlinked theatres and cinemas arranged radially around a quarter circle shaped car park, centred roughly on the site of the Belgrade. Through the late 1940s and early 1950s it became increasingly clear that only one theatre was needed, so Arthur Ling began work on the building that stands there today. The south east elevation is reminiscent of Gibson's Broadgate House (1948–53) with an arcade of shopfronts underneath a brick-clad block of flats for visiting actors, with regular square windows framed with pale stone. Ling departed from Gibson's theme for the rest of the building though, with its north east flank of Portland stone and glass. The north east elevation faces Belgrade Square, an open area with a fountain and some green space. When originally built the theatre had a covered entrance for people arriving in vehicles, which has since been removed.

Ling utilised the gift of beech timber from Belgrade to panel the inside of the auditorium, which was fitted out in the style of the Royal Festival Hall. The Russian architect Arkady Mordvinov visited in 1958, and praised the theatre's "intimate note" as well as the quality of the acoustics in the auditorium.

The extension opened in 2008 was designed by Stanton Williams, "contrasting [the] use of coloured renders and translucent panels" to "signal [...] presence within an evolving cityscape". It consists of a new seven-storey block to the north west of the existing theatre containing a 300-seat auditorium and additional rehearsal space. Its form and size aims to "[respond] to the scale of an adjacent new mixed-use development". The extension won a RIBA National award in 2008, and was described as "stunning" and "imposing" by the British Theatre Guide in 2007.

Belgrade Square

Belgrade Square sits with the theatre to its south east, and is faced by the Telegraph hotel from the north east. It contains a fountain of rectangular stepped pools and two sculptures.

A Memorial to Bryan Bailey

A Memorial to Bryan Bailey is a sculpture by Norelle Keddie originally produced in 1962. It commemorates the death of Bryan Bailey, the theatre's first director, in a car crash in 1960. It was recast in bronze and placed on its current plinth in 2008. It sits between the fountain and the front of the theatre.

Two Sides of a Woman

Two Sides of a Woman is a bronze sculpture by Helaine Blumenfeld, acquired by Coventry City in 1986. It sits to the west of the fountain in a raised bed.

Management
The Belgrade is run by the Belgrade Theatre Trust, a registered charity (number 219163) controlled by a board of trustees. The trust's objectives as stated in their memorandum of association are to "promote, maintain, improve and advance education, particularly by the production of educational plays and the encouragement of the arts". The trust's income was around £7.1 million in the 2019–20 financial year, predominantly from donations and charitable activities.

Staff
Management
 Chief Executive Laura Elliot
 Creative Director Corey Campbell

Trustees
Stewart Fergusson – Chair
Nathaniel Dodzo
Roger Bailey
Annette Hay
Hamish Glen
Alan Pollock
Jonathan James Wilby
Tony Skipper
Sheila Anne Bates
Joanna Reid
Paul Carvell

See also
Royal Festival Hall – live performance venue in London designed in the same period, inspired the auditorium of the Belgrade
Coventry Central Baths – another Coventry building designed by Ling

References

External links

 – Belgrade Theatre
 – Coventry UK City of Culture 2021

Theatres in Coventry
Belgrade Theatre, Coventry
Producing theatres in England